The Church of Saints Philip and James is a Roman Catholic church in Vukovar, Croatia.

History 

The church was built from 1723 till 1732, when it was blessed by Marko Dragojević.

In 1738 it was dedicated by Sigismund Berenyi.

In 1897 it was expanded according to the plans of Franz Langerberg and later Richard Jordan.

On 24 May 1899 the renovated and expanded church was dedicated by Anđelko Voršak.

In 1911 it was successfully painted with fresco paintings.

In 1924 were procured 3 new bells. One of that bells was given by last Vukovar countess, Sofija Eltz.

In 1991, during the battle of Vukovar, in the Croatian War of Independence, the church was extensively damaged.

In 1995, during the Serbian occupation of city, body of Saint Bono was burned.

After reintegration of Vukovar, in 2000 on church and monastery was installed a new roof. The church also got 3 new bells.

References 

Churches in Croatia
Roman Catholic churches in Vukovar-Syrmia County
Buildings and structures in Vukovar
Churches completed in 1732